Burt Township is a civil township of Cheboygan County in the U.S. state of Michigan. As of the 2010 census, the township population was 680.

Communities

Geography

Demographics
As of the census of 2000, there were 654 people, 312 households, and 208 families residing in the township. The racial makeup of the township was 95.11% White, 3.36% Native American, 0.15% Asian, and 1.38% from two or more races. Hispanic or Latino of any race were 0.31% of the population. There is also a small Jewish population.

There were 312 households, out of which 13.1% had children under the age of 18 living with them, 59.9% were married couples living together, 3.8% had a female householder with no husband present, and 33.3% were non-families. 30.4% of all households were made up of individuals, and 17.9% had someone living alone who was 65 years of age or older. The average household size was 2.10 and the average family size was 2.57.

In the township the population was spread out, with 13.0% under the age of 18, 4.6% from 18 to 24, 18.0% from 25 to 44, 35.5% from 45 to 64, and 28.9% who were 65 years of age or older. The median age was 54 years. For every 100 females, there were 104.4 males. For every 100 females age 18 and over, there were 107.7 males.

The median income for a household in the township was $38,816, and the median income for a family was $42,813. Males had a median income of $33,750 versus $26,500 for females. The per capita income for the township was $28,059. About 4.4% of families and 4.0% of the population were below the poverty line, including 3.2% of those under age 18 and 3.3% of those age 65 or over.

References

External links
Burt Township official website

Townships in Cheboygan County, Michigan
Townships in Michigan
Populated places established in 1880
1880 establishments in Michigan